Palmer Creek is a tributary of the Yamhill River in northwestern Oregon in the United States. Arising in Polk County it flows north, crossing almost immediately into Yamhill County.

Its two named tributaries from source to mouth are Holdridge Creek and West Fork Palmer Creek. The main stem passes under Oregon Route 221 in Dayton.

Palmer Creek was named after pioneer Joel Palmer; before, it was known as Smith Creek. It flows through private agricultural lands and is highly denuded by residual pesticides. Palmer Creek flows year-round because water from the Willamette River is diverted into the creek so it can be used for irrigation.

Fish 
Coastal cutthroat trout move into Palmer Creek from the Yamhill River during the autumn and winter, and a small number of them remain through summertime. Other fish that inhabit the Yamhill River and the lower section of Palmer Creek are carp, goldfish, largescale sucker, chiselmouth, redside shiner, peamouth chub, northern squawfish, sculpin, dace and Pacific lamprey.

See also 
 List of rivers of Oregon

References

External links 
Greater Yamhill Watershed Council
Irrigation program - Bureau of Reclamation

Rivers of Yamhill County, Oregon
Rivers of Polk County, Oregon
Rivers of Oregon